Sara Berman is the name of:

 Sara Berman (philanthropist), American philanthropist and journalist
 Sara Berman (fashion designer) (born 1976), British artist and fashion designer
 Sara Mae Berman (born 1936), American marathon runner

See also
Berman (surname)